Samahni valley is a valley situated in Bhimber District on the Line of Control that separates Pakistani-administered Azad Kashmir from Indian Jammu and Kashmir. 
It is 35 km long and about 8 km in width and covers an area of 1270 km2.  By covered area, it is the largest valley in Kashmir. 

Most of the inhabitants speak Pahari, with some Punjabi influence. Urdu is still spoken and understood among the villagers.

The Samahni valley has fourteen towns:
Jandi Chontra
Kadyala
Dab
Kalich
Bandala
Samahni 
Manana 
Sarsala
Chowki
Bindi
Jandala
burjun
mathoon
garhoon
darhal
Poona
Chaai
Baroh
Dall khambah 
Haripoor
Jajooha
Other important locations include:
Baghsar Fort - an ancient fort constructed by Mughal rulers 
Baghsar Lake
saray sada bad

Samahni is a strategically important location as it is near the LOC. It’s bordered by Rajouri district of India's Jammu and Kashmir.

References

Bhimber District
Valleys of Azad Kashmir